Rocky Krsnich (born Rocco Peter Krznić; August 5, 1927 – February 14, 2019) was a Major League Baseball third baseman.

Biography 
He was born in West Allis, Wisconsin. Krsnich originally signed as a free agent in 1945 with the Philadelphia Phillies. The following year, he joined the New York Yankees organization. In 1948, Krsnich was selected in the Minor League Draft by the Chicago White Sox. During his time with the White Sox, Krsnich played at the Major League level in 1949, as well as in 1952 and 1953. Later he was traded along with Saul Rogovin and Connie Ryan to the Cincinnati Reds for Willard Marshall. He is the brother of former MLB player Mike Krsnich. Krsnich died February 14, 2019.

References

External links

1927 births
2019 deaths
People from West Allis, Wisconsin
American people of Serbian descent
Baseball players from Wisconsin
Chicago White Sox players
Major League Baseball third basemen
Sportspeople from the Milwaukee metropolitan area
Wilmington Blue Rocks (1940–1952) players
Quincy Gems players
Joplin Miners players
Norfolk Tars players
Memphis Chickasaws players
Seattle Rainiers players
Portland Beavers players
Tulsa Oilers (baseball) players
Oklahoma City Indians players